Maggi Carolina Segovia Romero (born 15 January 2001) is a Salvadoran footballer who plays as a midfielder for CD FAS and the El Salvador women's national team.

Club career
Segovia has played for CD FAS in El Salvador.

International career
Segovia capped for El Salvador at senior level during the 2020 CONCACAF Women's Olympic Qualifying Championship qualification.

See also
List of El Salvador women's international footballers

References

2001 births
Living people
Salvadoran women's footballers
Women's association football midfielders
El Salvador women's international footballers